WKFB (770 AM) is a radio station licensed to Jeannette, Pennsylvania that serves the greater Pittsburgh area. The station also broadcasts on 97.5 FM. Known as "97.5 770 KFB", the station airs an oldies format featuring music from the 1950s, 1960s, and the early to mid 1970s. The station is very popular with the audience that prefers the older music and is the only station in southwestern Pennsylvania that plays an oldies format. WKFB is owned and operated by Broadcast Communications, Inc.

History
For many years this station was WBCW (1530), and for a brief period, WKTW.  The station originally operated at 1530 kHz with a daytime-only power of 1,000 watts, with 250 watts during critical hours, barely reaching the fringes of Westmoreland County.  WBCW was founded by broadcast engineer Albert Calisti, who first put it on the air back in 1974, having completed an eight-year stint as general manager of WTRA in Latrobe.

Very much a family business, Calisti did the engineering and hosted a provocative and often amusing local talk show called "People Talk" weekday afternoons from 1:00 p.m. to 3:00 p.m.  The show was so provocative that visitors to the Westmoreland County Court House in nearby Greensburg could hear WBCW playing up and down the halls in various row offices.  It was well known that various politically involved citizens including those at the court house who held political positions listened to the show daily to make sure that Calisti was not talking about them.  He was known to call certain people:"a kook".  The show was so provocative that his wife, Verna found it necessary to keep the front entrance door to the radio station locked during most afternoons, fearing that unwanted visitors who were upset with Al's show would show up and cause an unwanted incident.  But Al had a lighter side too, hosting a weekly polka music show on Saturdays called "Happy Music for Happy People".  Either way, Al definitely was a character and made a lot of people smile.  His wife Verna kept the books and sold airtime, and in the early years of the station operation their daughter Jacqueline Rae served as program director. The station had a limited number of other full-time and/or part-time employees outside of the Calisti family.  Clair Thomas, who served as the station's news and music director and who hosted a daily music show and daily talk show and who did the noon news block as well as hosted tradio during the noon hour was part of the operation during the 1980s and 1990s. Another notable WBCW personality was Mark Kuhns, also known as Marko Polka who handled various shifts, usually after 3:00 p.m. during the 1980s and 1990s.

The original format consisted of adult contemporary music from sign-on to 10:00 a.m. then a talk show from 10:00 a.m. to 12:00 p.m. (noon), a noon news block from 12:00 pm to 12:35 p.m. followed by tradio until 1:00 p.m. then "People Talk" from 1:00 p.m. to 3:00 p.m. with music until sign-off at sundown which also included a 5:00 p.m. news block when daytime operational hours permitted the station to be on the air.  The Calistis maintained ownership of the station which evolved to a full-time talk format with local and syndicated talk until 1998, when they sold it to Broadcast Communications, Inc. which had acquired Greensburg-based 620 WHJB (now WKHB)two years earlier in 1996. Al Calisti died of cancer seven years later.

Under the new ownership, the station moved from its original location at 111 South Fourth Street in Jeannette to WHJB's building at 245 Brown Street in Greensburg.  A frequency change to 770 was made in early 2004, giving the station much better coverage of the Pittsburgh market, allowing the station to reach all of Westmoreland, Fayette, Washington, and Allegheny counties as well as parts of Armstrong, Indiana, Somerset, Greene, Beaver, and Butler counties too.  The call letters WKFB were selected to be similar to sister station WKHB.

On-air hosts and programs

The oldies format of 97.5 770 KFB features various well-known oldies DJ's.

"The Frankie Day Oldies Show" featuring Frankie Day airs weekday mornings from 8:00 a.m. to 10:00 a.m. followed by "Big Ray's Blast from the Past" from 10:00 a.m. to Noon with a variety of DJ's including Glenn Raymer, Corvette Mick, or Gary Ed.  From Noon on through the rest of the day, the evening, overnight, and early morning until 8:00 a.m., Bill Korch and Michael J Daniels are heard on the station as the oldies continue 24/7.

The weekend oldies shows are also very heavily listened to.  The various oldies shows on Saturdays include:"The Rockin' Golden Oldies Show" with Glen Raymer and Corvette Mick from 7:00 a.m.- 10:00 a.m., "The Library of Golden Oldies" with Dr. Doo-Wop & Ms. Shoo-Bop (Dennis & Becky Spinella) from 10:00 a.m. - 12:00 p.m., "Sounds of Sinatra" with Bo Wagner from 12:00 p.m. to 2:00 p.m., and "The Frankie Day Oldies Show" featuring Frankie Day from 2:00 p.m. to 5:00 p.m.

The Sunday oldies shows include: "Georgie O's Oldies Cafe" with George Rocelle & Gary Ed from 8:00 a.m. to Noon and "The Nite Train Vault Of Memories Show" with Kid Doo Wop (Jared Panek) from 5:00 p.m. - 8:00 p.m.

Sunday ministry and ethnic programming include:  "Song & Verse" with Stan & Bonnie Detar from 12:15 pm to 12:30 pm, The First Presbyterian Church of Jeannette from 12:30 pm to 1:00 pm, and "Sounds of the Tamburitza" with Michael Hogel from 1:00 p.m. to 3:00 p.m.

References

External links
770 KFB Facebook

KFB
Radio stations established in 1974
1974 establishments in Pennsylvania
KFB